Velvet Mood: Songs by Billie Holiday is an album by jazz singer Billie Holiday, released in 1956 on Clef Records.  The music was recorded over the course of two sessions in Los Angeles, two days apart, which had also resulted in all the material for her previous album Music for Torching (MG C-669).

Track listing

Side one
 "Prelude to a Kiss" (Duke Ellington, Irving Mills, Irving Gordon) - 5:37
 "When Your Lover Has Gone" (Einar Aaron Swan) - 4:58
 "Please Don't Talk About Me When I'm Gone" (Sam H. Stept, Sidney Clare, Bee Palmer) - 4:23
 "Nice Work If You Can Get It" (George Gershwin, Ira Gershwin) - 3:48

Side two
 "I Gotta Right to Sing the Blues" (Harold Arlen, Ted Koehler) - 5:55
 "What's New?" (Bob Haggart, Johnny Burke) – 4:20
 "I Hadn't Anyone Till You" (Ray Noble) – 4:05
 "Everything I Have Is Yours" (Burton Lane, Harold Adamson) – 4:33

Personnel
Billie Holiday - Vocals
Benny Carter - Alto saxophone
Harry "Sweets" Edison - Trumpet
Jimmy Rowles - Piano, celesta on "I Hadn't Anyone Till You", "Everything I Have Is Yours", and "What's New?"
Barney Kessel - Guitar
John Simmons - Bass
Larry Bunker - Drums

Alex de Paula - artwork

References

1956 albums
Billie Holiday albums
Clef Records albums
Albums produced by Norman Granz